Kalenow-e Sofla (also Romanized as Kalenow-ye Soflá; also known as Kalenow-ye Pā’īn) is a village in Birun Bashm Rural District, Kelardasht District, Chalus County, Mazandaran Province, Iran. At the 2006 census, its population was 686, in 185 families.

References 

Populated places in Chalus County